Prince Tonye Princewill (Tonye Princewill) (born 4 January 1969) is a Nigerian investor, politician, film producer and philanthropist who was the 2015 Labour Party and 2007 Action Congress nominee for Governor of Rivers State. He is currently a member of the All Progressives Congress (APC) and the son of King T.J.T. Princewill of the Kalabari Kingdom of Rivers State, Nigeria.

Early life and education

Prince Tonye Princewill was born in the UK to the family of the present King (Prof) T.J.T. Princewill, the Amanyanabo of Kalabari Kingdom of the Amachree Dynasty of Rivers State. His father was a Professor of Medical Microbiology before he became a monarch. His mother, Ibiere Princewill, an entrepreneur and notably successful in Distribution and Farming, passed away in 2000.

Tonye Princewill started his early education in the United Kingdom, before returning with his parents to Nigeria, where he enrolled at Hillcrest High School in Jos from 1976–1980. He then attended Federal Government College (Port Harcourt) where he obtained his West African Senior Certificate/ General Certificate of Education O'Level in 1985. In 1990 he attained a BEng in Petroleum engineering at the University of Port Harcourt and later returned to the UK to successfully complete a master's degree in Mineral Resources Engineering at the Imperial College London in 1994.

Professional career
Princewill's professional career spans over 10 years, where he worked as a Petroleum Engineer in multi-national companies such as Shell and Saipem, later at Sun Microsystems as a Technical Project Manager; Sony, London Stock Exchange and Panasonic as a Technical Consultant and finally Citibank in the Global Asset Management Division on their Technology Desk.

Oil and Gas 
Tonye Princewill's interest in the oil and gas industry saw him working at the prestigious Royal Dutch Shell (Shell) as a Reservoir and Well-site Petroleum Engineer. He also worked briefly with the UK's Oil and Gas Regulatory Agency, the Department of Trade and Industry. He has since then established his own private company called Riverdrill Group of Companies (Nigeria) where he currently serves as the Chairman.

Investments 
Princewill is an avid investor in the Oil and Gas industry, ICT, Environmental Waste Management, Aviation Services, Property Development and Film production.

Entertainment
Tonye Princewill is a film producer. He produced the film, Kajola, a film that explored the implications of the continuous neglect of the masses, the widening gap between the rich and poor and the ensuing catastrophic outcomes stemming from such neglect.  Tonye Princewill also produced the film, Nnenda, which was geared towards creating awareness for the less-privileged in society. He produced other films such as Valour, a movie that deals with the Niger Delta and Boko Haram issues

He is one of the executive producers of the highly acclaimed movie '76 (film).

'76 (Film) 
In 2016, Princewill’s production company: Princewill Trust produced the groundbreaking blockbuster, ’76, a post-civil war drama handsomely shot on Super 16mm film.  The film received international recognition for the unique portrayal of the 1976 coup in Nigeria which aimed at preserving a remarkable part of Nigeria's history for the incoming generation. The Hollywood Reporter called it "a cut above most Nollywood movies".

The film is set six years after the civil war when a young officer from the Middle Belt develops a romantic relationship and later marries a young student from the South-Eastern region. However, their relationship is strained by constant military postings. The soldier is ultimately accused of being involved in the 1976 unsuccessful military coup and assassination of General Murtala Mohammed. This captivating story is told from two points of view: the young wife and her soldier husband.

76 was shot in Ibadan, Oyo State and had its world premiere at the 2016 Toronto International Film Festival with a later screening at the London Film Festival, amongst several other festivals around the world

Politics 
Princewill's political career started when he was nominated as the gubernatorial candidate of the Action Congress for the governorship of Rivers State in 2007. He was supported by the then former Vice-President of Nigeria and the AC Presidential candidate in 2007 elections, Atiku Abubakar and former Governor of Lagos and National Leader of ACN, Asiwaju Bola Tinubu. Tonye Princewill's campaign attracted significant grassroots support. He lost the election under contested circumstances to the People's Democratic Party's (PDP) candidate, Celestine Omehia.

Tonye Princewill launched a legal challenge against the newly elected governor shortly after the election results were released. He offered evidence to prove to the electoral tribunal that the election was rigged. In a newspaper interview, he alleged that Celestine Omehia offered him a Naira 1.5 billion (approximately USD 10 million) bribe to withdraw the case before the tribunal, which he rejected.

Following a Supreme Court decision to replace Celestine Omehia with another People's Democratic Party candidate Rotimi Amaechi, he withdrew his case at the tribunal following a local party decision of the Action Congress in Rivers State, a move which drew criticism from some quarters. 
Tonye Princewill said in a report that "we took the decision at the time that the enemy of your enemy is your friend," indicating his opponents were Celestine Omehia and his 'godfather', Dr. Peter Odili, the former governor of Rivers State, when Rotimi Amaechi was installed by the court. He claimed that the decision to withdraw the case was made even easier because the same people who offered to give him 1.5 billion to withdraw his case, came back to offer him 1.5 billion and evidence of how they rigged the election against him to keep his case in court. This was hoping he would remove Amaechi.

Tonye Princewill later led members of the opposition parties in Rivers State under the banner of the Forum of Organized Opposition Political Parties to form a unity government with Amaechi's administration. 
Tonye Princewill's support of the Amaechi's government received mixed reviews.  Some viewed it with scepticism, while others saw it as necessary for the development and stability of Rivers State. His announcement in 2010 that he was returning to the People's Democratic Party was controversial and weakened opposition in the state. But he insisted that threats being issued by national officers in AC to hand the structure of the party to his opponents if he didn’t bring money from Amaechi were no longer tenable. He joined PDP, but took a back seat.

As if to prove his point, the party he left, played into the hands of his opponents, performed woefully against the PDP in the next election.

In 2013, he joined the management committee of People's Democratic Movement (PDM), the founding movement behind the People's Democratic Party. Princewill has since removed his support of the PDP but PDM remains a movement. He currently serves as its Director of Organisation.

At the beginning of 2014, after several months of speculation on his political future, Tonye Princewill indicated his interest to succeed Rotimi Amaechi, the current governor of Rivers State.
Then in April 2014, he announced the formation of an Exploratory Committee to explore the viability of his candidacy of running for governor of Rivers State. Tonye Princewill was a governorship aspirant candidate for the People's Democratic Party, but in November 2014 announced that he had been disqualified on the instruction of Nyesom Wike, former minister of State for Education and fellow Governorship aspirant on the grounds of "not being a PDP member".

Left with no choice, Princewill parted ways with PDP and in January 2015, he was chosen as the governorship candidate of the Labour Party in Rivers State, on a single-issue manifesto; job-creation. Again, he lost that election in what was described as the most violent election ever as PDP and APC exchanged gunfire. The Labour Party remained neutral and it wasn’t until 2017 Princewill opted to join forces with APC to challenge the PDP government. He opted however not to contest, but to work for the success of the party.

Princewill, now an avid APC member and frontline chieftain, was appointed the Director of Strategic Communication for APC’s Tonye Cole during his 2018 Gubernatorial campaign in Rivers state. Unfortunately, the APC was expelled from contesting in the 2019 elections as the courts, allegedly working with the PDP, conspired to disqualify the APC from contesting the election, thereby facilitating an unchallenged path to re-election for the PDP. The scandal of the series of judgements that led to this outcome, is now a subject of local, national and international scrutiny.

Public affairs and Engagement 

Tonye Princewill writes about confronting corruption, infrastructure development, behaviour change, security, health, academic advancement and ethnic harmony in his weekly column in the Vanguard newspaper 
As a leading advocate of youth empowerment in Nigeria, he has expressed concern about the use of youth in Nigeria, particularly during elections, for violence and thuggery.

Following the heavy floods that ravaged parts of Nigeria in 2012, he organised relief activities for Niger Delta communities through the Princewill Trust. He has launched several initiatives to support Nigerian youth, rural women, orphans and widows.  In June 2012, Tonye Princewill sponsored Nigerian youth delegations on tours to Dubai and Ghana to learn about entrepreneurship, governance, leadership and self-development.

In January 2013, in celebration of his 44th birthday, Tonye Princewill released a documentary titled "Man. Mentor. Maverick" in which he speaks about his vision of equal opportunities for all.

Tonye Princewill is an advocate for open government and effective public service delivery using modern technology. This earned him the nickname, the "Digital Politician."

Princewill sponsored several baseline studies in 2013, covering the state of education, environment, and health in Rivers State. In education, research showed that a large number of Model Secondary and Primary Schools were not finished and had been abandoned. 
The management of oil spillages in Rivers State, a catalyst for youth restiveness, was seen as ineffective across local governments in the State. Survey respondents reported that funds which ought to have gone into cleaning and sanitisation of their communities were diverted by local officials. These findings also support press reports about corruption in government allocations to oil-producing areas. 
In the area of health, there is widespread disenchantment about the lack of improvement within the sector. Weak health service delivery in Rivers State is forcing many patients to seek medical attention at unregulated traditional medicine shops. Challenges associated to HIV/AIDS, the lack of qualified health professionals, and unfinished health projects, are serious concerns among respondents. These findings substantiate reports in the press that raise questions about the efficacy of funds injected into the sector by the Rivers State administration.

Princewill is still active on the political scene and continues to advocate for a reform in governance.  During a 2019 interview to celebrate his 50th birthday, he is stated, "My political career is intact. Good people are becoming more and more critical to move Nigeria forward. When Nigerians realise we cannot continue like this, they will look for people like us or younger versions to exhibit excellence and toughness combined. I do not have to be the one running for office, but either way I will be involved."

Princewill also continues to invest in his business interests, youth empowerment in Nigeria and is currently working on another upcoming Blockbuster centered around Boko Haram, with a release date TBD.

Personal life
Tonye Princewill is married to Rosemary, and has a daughter (Azariah) and twin boys (Teetee and Teepee).

References 

 https://metronews247.co.uk/tonye-princewill-set-to-run-for-2023-rivers-state-gubernatorial-elections/ Metronews247 Media

External links
 Tonye Princewill Official Website
 New Rivers State Website
 '76 The Movie

1969 births
Living people
Engineers from Rivers State
People associated with the 2015 Rivers State gubernatorial election
21st-century Nigerian politicians
Nigerian royalty
University of Port Harcourt alumni
Alumni of Imperial College London
Businesspeople from Port Harcourt
Politicians from Port Harcourt
Rivers State Peoples Democratic Party politicians
Articles containing video clips
Rivers State gubernatorial candidates
Film producers from Rivers State